Patrick James Crotty (23 November 1902 – 26 November 1970) was an Irish Fine Gael politician who served as a Teachta Dála (TD) for the Carlow–Kilkenny constituency from 1948 to 1969.

He was elected to Dáil Éireann at the 1948 general election, and re-elected five times, at the 1951, 1954, 1957, 1961 and 1965 general elections. He served as Parliamentary Secretary to the Minister for Industry and Commerce from 1954 to 1957.

Crotty did not contest the 1969 general election, but his son Kieran Crotty was elected for the same constituency at that election.

See also
Families in the Oireachtas

References

 

Fine Gael TDs
1902 births
1970 deaths
Members of the 13th Dáil
Members of the 14th Dáil
Members of the 15th Dáil
Members of the 16th Dáil
Members of the 17th Dáil
Members of the 18th Dáil
Politicians from County Kilkenny
Parliamentary Secretaries of the 15th Dáil